This is a list of aviation-related events during the 18th century (January 1, 1701 – December 31, 1800):

1700s–1770s
1709
Portuguese Father Bartolomeu de Gusmão demonstrates a practical model of a hot-air balloon made of a paper envelope with burning material suspended below it to King John V of Portugal in the Ambassadors drawing room. Worried that it will set fire to the curtains, servants end its flight by dashing it to the ground. It is the first known demonstration of a practical lighter-than-air craft.
1716
 Well thought-out glider-project of the Swedish scholar Emanuel Swedenborg. Basis for his construction are bird flight and the glider kite.
1738
In his Hydrodynamica the Swiss scholar Daniel Bernoulli (1700–1782) formulates the principle of the conservation of energy for fluids (Bernoulli's principle), the relationship between pressure and velocity in a flow.
1746
English military engineer Benjamin Robins (1707–1751) invented a whirling arm centrifuge to determine drag.
1766
British chemist Henry Cavendish determines the specific weight of hydrogen gas.

1780s–1790s

1782
1783
June 4, Unmanned flight of the Montgolfier brothers 900 m linen Montgolfière hot air balloon at Annonay near Lyon in the Vivarais region of France as a public demonstration. The flight covers 2 km and lasts 10 minutes, to an estimated altitude of 1600–2000 metres.
August 27, Flight of Le Globe, an unmanned experimental hydrogen-balloon, in Paris (built by Professor Charles and the Robert brothers). It flies  from Paris to Gonesse and is destroyed by frightened peasants.
September 19, the Montgolfiers launch a sheep, duck and rooster in a hot-air balloon in a demonstration for King Louis XVI of France.
October 15, Pilâtre de Rozier and Marquis d'Arlandes rise into the air in a Montgolfière tethered to the ground in Paris. de Rozier becomes the first human passenger in a hot-air balloon, rising .
November 21, In a flight lasting 25 minutes, de Rozier and d'Arlandes take the first untethered ride in a Montgolfière in Paris, the first human passengers carried in free flight by a hot-air balloon.
December 1, Jacques Charles and his assistant Nicolas-Louis Robert make the first flight in a hydrogen-filled balloon, La Charlière.
December 26, Louis-Sébastien Lenormand makes the first ever recorded public demonstration of a parachute descent by jumping from the tower of the Montpellier observatory in France using his rigid-framed model which he intends as a form of fire escape.
1784
February 25, The first ascent of a manned balloon in Italy takes place with a hot air balloon carrying Paolo Andreani and two of its builders, the Gerli brothers.
March 2, Jean-Pierre Blanchard makes his first flight in a hydrogen balloon.
March 13 The first public ascent of a manned balloon in Italy takes place with a hot air balloon at the Villa Sormani in Moncucco carrying Paolo Andreani and two locals.
April 15, The first ascent of a manned balloon in the British Isles takes place with a hot air balloon at Navan in Ireland.
June 4, Élisabeth Thible becomes the first woman passenger in a hot-air balloon, at Lyon in France.
August 25 & 27, Scottish apothecary James Tytler makes the first balloon ascents in Great Britain, in a hot air balloon from Edinburgh.
September 15, Italian Vincenzo Lunardi makes the first hydrogen balloon flight in Britain, from Moorfields in London to South Mimms.
September 19, Anne-Jean Robert, Nicolas-Louis Robert and Colin Hullin fly La Carolina, a hydrogen balloon,  from Paris to Beuvry.
October 4, Englishman James Sadler makes the first hot air balloon flight in England, from Oxford to Woodeaton.
October 16, Jean-Pierre Blanchard fits a hand-powered propeller to a balloon flow from London, the first recorded means of propulsion carried aloft.
Jean Baptiste Meusnier makes an oblong balloon to explore unknown areas, with an airscrew driven by muscle power.
1785
January 7, Jean-Pierre Blanchard makes the first flight across the English Channel. He uses a hydrogen balloon and carries John Jeffries as a passenger, flying from Dover, England, to Guînes, France.
January 19, Richard Crosbie successfully flies in a hot air balloon from Ranelagh Gardens to Clontarf, Dublin, Ireland. He goes on to makes several unsuccessful attempts to cross the Irish Sea in a hydrogen-filled balloon.
 May 10, A hot air balloon collides with a chimney in Tullamore in Ireland, setting light to around 100 houses in the town centre. 
June 15, Pilâtre de Rozier and Pierre Jules Romain become the first known aeronautical fatalities when their balloon crashes during an attempt to cross the English Channel.
 October 5, Vincenzo Lunardi flies in a gas balloon from George Heriot's School, Edinburgh, across the Firth of Forth in Scotland to Ceres, Fife ( in 1.5 hrs).
 November 23, Lunardi flies from St Andrew's Square, Glasgow, to Hawick in Scotland.
Ukita Kōkichi, Japanese paperhanger, makes artificial wings and tries flying from the top of a bridge.
1789
First experiments in Japan to develop an ornithopter-type glider.
1793
Military use of a captive balloon at the siege of Mainz, Germany.
January 9, Jean-Pierre Blanchard makes probably the first balloon ascent in the Western Hemisphere, lifting off from the prison yard at the Walnut Street Jail in Philadelphia, Pennsylvania, crossing the Delaware River and landing at Deptford, New Jersey, carrying an "aerial passport" endorsed by President George Washington. Washington, John Adams, Thomas Jefferson, James Madison and James Monroe all witness the flight. 
July 30, Jean-Marie-Joseph Coutelle, Louis-Bernard Guyton de Morveau and Antoine-Laurent de Lavoisier complete a military hydrogen balloon ordered by the French Committee of Public Safety. They will present it to the committee in October 1793.
1794
April 2, The French National Convention establishes the 50-man Company of Aeronauts, the first airship company in the French Army. It is commanded by Captain Jean-Marie-Joseph Coutelle.
May 3, After completing its training, the Company of Aeronauts is assigned to the French Army of Sambre-et-Meuse for operational employment.
June 2, The first military aviation sortie in history takes place when the French Company of Aeronauts' balloon l'Entreprenant ("Enterprise") ascends for a reconnaissance of Austrian forces besieging Maubeuge. Austrian artillery fires at the balloon but fails to hit it before it rises out of range.
June 23, The French balloon l'Entreprenant resumes flights, helping to prevent Austrian troops from relieving besieged Austrian forces at Charleroi. On the same day, the Committee of Public Safety authorizes the formation of a second balloon company in the French Army.
June 26, Jean-Marie-Joseph Coutelle and Major General Antoine Morlot spend nine hours aloft in the balloon l'Entreprenant during the Battle of Fleurus, providing observation that contributes to a French victory over Austrian forces. It is the first battle in history to be affected by aerial observation.
1795
October 29, Observation balloons used in Battle of Mainz. 
1797
He is declared "official French aeronaut of the state".
1798
At least one balloon of the French armys Company of Aeronauts is transported aboard the French Navy warship Le Patriote for use ashore in conducting a reconnaissance of the coast of Egypt, but Le Patriote strikes a rock and sinks off Alexandria, Egypt, on July 4.
August 1, The French ship-of-the-line Orient has gear of the French Armys Company of Aeronauts on board when she is destroyed during the Battle of the Nile.
October 15, First balloon ascent on horseback: Pierre Testu-Brissy ascends from Bellevue, Meudon in Paris.
1799
Englishman Sir George Cayley (1773–1857) sketches a glider with a rudder unit and an elevator unit. His manuscript is considered to be the starting point of the scientific research on heavier than air flying machines. It is Cayley who helps to sort out the confusion of the time. ..."He knew more than any of his predecessors ... and successors up to the end of the 19th century." – Orville Wright. Even so, his ideas do not affect further development very much.
Birth of John Stringfellow, another English pioneer of heavier than air flying machines (d. 1883).
January 15, The French Armys Company of Aeronauts is abolished.
October 12, Jeanne Geneviève Labrosse becomes the first woman to jump from a balloon with a parachute, from an altitude of 900 m.

See also

 Timeline of aviation – 19th century

References

1701
18th century in transport